The 2009–10 season is Stockport County's 128th season in football, and the second in England's third tier of football since gaining promotion via the League Two Play Offs in 2008. Stockport completed the whole season in Administration. This season ran from 8 August 2009 to 8 May 2010.

Gary Ablett was named manager of Stockport for the whole of the season after his Predecessor Jim Gannon was made redundant in the summer of 2009.

Background
This is a list of the significant events to occur at the club during the 2009–10 season, presented in chronological order. This list does not include transfers, which are listed in the transfers section below, or match results, which are in the results section.

After ending the 2008–09 season in 18th position with 50 points (60 points without the ten-point deduction), Stockport County were placed into administration following a battle to repay creditors. A creditor of the club wrote a petition to repay a loan of around £300,000 to him. The club has also struggled to repay a tax debt of £250,000 to Her Majesty's Revenue and Customs.

On 17 June the Administrators agreed terms with the Melrose Consortium for the sale of Stockport County.
The club also announced that they will play Huddersfield Town away in the League Cup First Round., As well as announcing the fixtures for the season

On 3 July Administrators agree Company Voluntary Arrangement (CVA) with previous shareholders and creditors.

On 8 July Stockport County appointment Gary Ablett as new manager.

On 22 July Stockport Announced their new kit for the season which was manufactured my Macron. The home kit was a traditional blue and white, while there was a new away kit which consisted of orange and black.

On 27 July Gary Ablett appointed Paul Gerrard as the club's goalkeeping coach, Gerrard also carried on his playing career for the club as he registered as cover for first choice goalkeeper Owain Fôn Williams .

On 3 September Carl Baker became the first Stockport County player to score consecutive away hat-tricks, after he scored Three in a 4–2 win over Brighton in the League and also three in a 4–1 win over Crewe in the Football League Trophy
Due to Carl'shat -trick against Crewe, Stockport advanced to the second round where they faced Port Vale However a day later Assistant Manager John Ward left the club to take up same position at Colchester United.

On 18 September Gary Ablett was handed a one match touchline ban after he was dismissed to the stands against Leeds United away from home.

On 16 December 2009 the team's training ground was put up for sale.

Summary

Results summary

Round by round

League One table

Statistics

Goalscorers

Penalties Awarded

Assists

Disciplinary record

Note: Cards from all competitions are included.

Player Awards

Overall statistics

{|class="wikitable"
|-
| style="width:125px;"| Statistic
| style="width:100px;"| Total
| style="width:100px;"| League
| style="width:100px;"| FA Cup
| style="width:100px;"| League Cup
| style="width:100px;"| Football League Trophy
|-
|Games played || 51 || 46 || 2 || 1 || 2
|-
|Games won || 7 || 5 || 1 || 0 || 1
|-
|Games drawn || 10 || 10 || 0 || 0 || 0
|-
|Games lost || 34 || 31 || 1 || 1 || 1
|-
|Goals scored || 46 || 35 || 5 || 1 || 5
|-
|Goals conceded || 106 || 95 || 4 || 3 || 4
|-
|Goal difference || −60 || −60 || 1 || −2 || 1
|-
|Clean sheets || 7 || 6 || 1 || 0 || 0
|-
|Yellow cards || 63 || 59 || 1 || 2 || 1
|-
|Red cards || 7 || 7 || 0 || 0 || 0
|-
|Biggest win || colspan="5" | 4–1 vs Crewe Alexandra, Football League Trophy, 1 September 2009.
|-
|Biggest defeat || colspan="5" | 0–6 vs Huddersfield Town, League One, 24 April 2010.
|-
|Most appearances || colspan="5" |  Owain Fôn Williams — 46 (46 starts, 0 substitute)
|-
|Top scorer || colspan="5" |  Carl Baker — 13
|-
|Top assists || colspan="5" |  Danny Pilkington — 3 
 Liam Bridcutt — 3 
 David Poole — 3
|-
|Worst discipline || colspan="5" |  Johnny Mullins —  8  0    David Poole —  4   2 
|-

Review

Pre-season

During Stockport's Pre-Season campaign they wore a limited edition kit containing the colours of pink and black which was manufactured by Prostar. This was worn until the official kits were announced. The pink and black kits were used to raise money for leukaemia research. These kits were then auctioned off after pre-season.

Stockport began pre-season with a 0 – 0 away draw against Barrow in Gary Ablett's first match in charge. Stockport's next Pre-Season match was away to Nostell Miners Welfare in which Stockport won 5 – 0. With Goals coming from Oli Johnson, Peter Thompson (Northern Ireland footballer) (Who scored two) and Tom Fisher (footballer) (Who also scored two). Four Days later Stockport won their third consecutive Pre-Season match when they won 1 – 0 away to Vauxhall Motors. Craig Roberts scored the only goal of the game for Stockport from 30 yards.
 On 25 July Stockport won their first Pre-Season home game when they beat Grimsby Town 1 – 0. David Poole scored the only goal for Stockport.
Matty Mainwaring would suffer a serious leg injury in this match ruling him out for the season. Stockport would then travel to Belfast to play against striker Peter Thompson's former club Linfield in Glenn Ferguson's testimonial match. Stockport ran away with a 3 – 1 win with, Greg Tansey, Danny Pilkington and Adam Griffin scoring for Stockport. Glenn Ferguson scored the home sides consolation. Stockport's final Pre-Season match was against La Liga outfit Real Valladolid in a match they lost 3 – 1. Gianluca Havern scored Stockport's only goal after 20 minutes.

August
Stockport earned a point in their first League match of the season with a 0 – 0 draw against Oldham Athletic. Stockport exited this season's Carling Cup in the first round when the lost 3 – 1 away to Huddersfield Town. Jordan Rhodes scored 2 for the home side and Theo Robinson extended the lead to 3. David Poole scored a consolation for Stockport in the 88th minute. Stockport then lost 2 – 0 at home to Bristol Rovers. Danny Coles and Jo Kuffour scored the Rovers goals. Three days later, Stockport then lost for the second time in succession in the league when they lost 2 – 1 at home to Carlisle United. Kevan Hurst opened the scoring but one minute later Stockport were lever via a Richard Keogh own goal.Joe Anyinsah rounded off the scoring to give Carlisle the points. Stockport won their first match of the season when they beat Brighton & Hove Albion 4 – 2, in a match that was full of instances. Three of Stockport's four goals were scored by Carl Baker (One of which was a penalty) the other was scored by Oli Johnson. Liam Bridcutt was sent off on his Stockport début.
Nicky Forster and Former Stockport star Liam Dickinson scored while Tommy Elphick and Colin Hawkins were sent off for the home side. Stockport finished the month with a 1 – 1 draw at home to Southampton. Carl Baker scored his second penalty in a week to salvage a point in second half stoppage time. Former Stockport midfielder Rickie Lambert scored a penalty for Southampton in first half stoppage time.

September

Space left for review edits

October

Space left for review edits

November

Space left for review edits

December

Space left for review edits

January

Space left for review edits

February

Space left for review edits

March

Space left for review edits

April

Space left for review edits

May

Space left for review edits

Results

Legend

Pre-season friendlies

League One

FA Cup

League Cup

Football League Trophy

Team

Due to Stockport starting the season in Administration, the club had to sell some of its best players to accommodate everyday running costs and wage budget. Tommy Rowe was the first to leave after he was bought by Peterborough United for an undisclosed fee 10 days after the previous season ended. Four days later Leon McSweeney left for Hartlepool United on a free transfer

Squad

Transfers

In

Out

Loans in

Loans out

References

External links
 Official Site

Stockport County
Stockport County F.C. seasons